David Štich (born 15 April 1989 in Plzeň) is a Czech professional ice hockey defenceman who currently plays with BK Mladá Boleslav in the Czech Extraliga (ELH) on loan from fellow Czechia club, HC Litvínov. 

Štich previously played for HC Lasselsberger Plzeň, HC Berounští Medvědi, Saint John Sea Dogs, Montreal Juniors, HC Benátky nad Jizerou Bílí Tygři Liberec and HC Slavia Praha, HC Vítkovice, BK Mladá Boleslav, HC Kladno and Piráti Chomutov.

References

External links

1989 births
Living people
HC Benátky nad Jizerou players
HC Berounští Medvědi players
HC Bílí Tygři Liberec players
Czech ice hockey defencemen
Hartford Wolf Pack players
Rytíři Kladno players
BK Mladá Boleslav players
Montreal Juniors players
Peoria Rivermen (AHL) players
Piráti Chomutov players
HC Plzeň players
Saint John Sea Dogs players
HC Slavia Praha players
HC Vítkovice players
Sportspeople from Plzeň
Czech expatriate ice hockey players in Canada
Czech expatriate ice hockey players in the United States